Rudolf Urban is the name of the following persons:

 Rudolf Urban (soccer player) (born 1980), Slovak soccer player
 Rudolf Urban (Berlin Wall victim) (1914–1961)